During the 1907–08 season Hearts competed in the Scottish First Division, the Scottish Cup and the East of Scotland Shield.

Fixtures

East of Scotland Shield

Rosebery Charity Cup

Scottish Cup

East of Scotland League

Scottish First Division

See also
List of Heart of Midlothian F.C. seasons

References

Statistical Record 07-08

External links
Official Club website

Heart of Midlothian F.C. seasons
Heart of Midlothian